Phyllocnistis vitegenella is a moth of the family Gracillariidae. It is native to North America, but has been recorded from northern Italy in 1994, Slovenia in 2004 and Switzerland in 2009.

The larvae feed on American native species of Vitis and it has become a pest of the cultivated Vitis vinifera. They mine the leaves of their host plants. The mine consists of a long, slender, wavy, upper-surface corridor with a broad, dark, cloudy frass line. There are often several mines in a single leaf. Pupation takes place within the mine in the somewhat widened terminal section of the corridor.

References

Phyllocnistis
Moths of Europe
Moths of North America